Edward Sell may refer to:

Edward Sell (priest) (1839–1932), Anglican orientalist, writer and missionary in India
W. Edward Sell (1923–2004), Dean of the University of Pittsburgh School of Law
Edward B. Sell (1942–2014), founder of the United States Chung Do Kwan Association